Strigatella tabida is a species of sea snail, a marine gastropod mollusk, in the family Mitridae, the miters or miter snails.

Description
The length of the shell attains 17.6 mm.

Distribution
This marine species occurs off the Tuamotu Archipelago

References

 Herrmann, M. & Salisbury, R. A. (2013). Three new Mitridae (Gastropoda) from French Polynesia with a new record for Mitra cernohorskyi (Rehder & Wilson, 1975. Conchylia. 44(1-2): 31-43.

tabida
Gastropods described in 2013